The Sony Xperia 5 II is an Android smartphone marketed and manufactured by Sony Mobile. Part of Sony's flagship Xperia series, the phone was announced on September 17, 2020. The device is a less expensive and more compact variant of the Xperia 1 II. The phone was released worldwide in October 2020.

The Xperia 5 II ships with support for 5G NR in Europe and Asia (making it Sony's second Xperia device to support this network), while the United States will ship with a 4G variant. Although 5G networks are supported, it only supports "sub-6" 5G, meaning it is not compatible with millimeter-wave (mmWave) networks.

Design
The Xperia 5 II retains Sony's signature square design that is seen on previous Xperia phones. It is built similarly to the Xperia 1 II, using anodized aluminum for the frame and Corning Gorilla Glass 6 for the screen and back panel, as well as IP65 and IP68 certifications for water resistance. The build has a pair of symmetrical bezels on the top and the bottom, where the front-facing dual stereo speakers and the front camera are placed. The left side of the phone contains a slot for a SIM card and a microSDXC card, while the right side contains a fingerprint reader embedded into the power button, a volume rocker and a shutter button. A dedicated Google Assistant button is located between the power and shutter buttons. The earpiece, front-facing camera, notification LED and various sensors are housed in the top bezel. The bottom edge has the primary microphone and USB-C port; the rear cameras are arranged in a vertical strip. The phone ships in four colours: Black, Gray, Blue and Pink.

Specifications

Hardware
The Xperia 5 II is powered by the Qualcomm Snapdragon 865 SoC and an Adreno 650 GPU, accompanied by 8 GB of LPDDR4X RAM. It has 128 or 256 GB of UFS internal storage, and microSD expansion is supported up to 1 TB with a hybrid dual-SIM setup. The display is smaller and has a lower resolution than the Xperia 1 II, using a 6.1 in 21:9 1080p (2520 × 1080) HDR OLED panel which results in a pixel density of 449 ppi. While the size and resolution are unchanged, it features a 120 Hz refresh rate. The camera system is similar to the Xperia 1 II in terms of hardware (a 12 MP primary lens, a 12 MP telephoto lens and a 12 MP ultrawide lens with an 8 MP front camera), but does not have a 3D iToF sensor. The telephoto lens has been upgraded from 2x to 3x optical zoom, and the ultrawide lens gains autofocus. Additionally, the lenses add ZEISS' T✻ (T-Star) anti-reflective coating. Software improvements include JPG+RAW shooting and HDR for 4K/120fps slow motion videos. The battery capacity has been increased to 4000mAh, the same as the 1 II despite the smaller body. USB Power Delivery 3.0 is supported at 21W over USB-C, although it lacks wireless charging capabilities. The device includes a 3.5mm audio jack, which was removed on its predecessor, as well as an active external amplifier.

Software
The Xperia 5 II runs on Android 10. Sony has also paired the phone's camera tech with a "Pro" mode developed by Sony's camera division CineAlta, whose features take after Sony's Alpha camera lineup.

Notes

References

External links 

 

Android (operating system) devices
Flagship smartphones
Sony smartphones
Mobile phones introduced in 2020
Mobile phones with multiple rear cameras
Mobile phones with 4K video recording